T. K. Bhagavathi (born 1917) was an Indian actor in Tamil stage dramas and cinema. He was the youngest brother of T. K. Shanmugam. He was famous for playing major roles in dramas and films for 45 years from 1935 to 1979. His debut film was Menaka (1935). His majestic walk, body language and bold voice earned him the reputation.

Early life 
T.K.S Brothers quartet consisted of four: Sankaran, Muthuswamy, Shanmugam, Bhagavathy. They staged plays all over Tamil Nadu and in neighboring Tamil speaking countries, during the pre-independent period of India. In addition, T.K.Bhagavathi had acted in many character roles such as father and brother in Tamil movies with popular yesteryear heroes and heroines.

Film career 
S. V. Ranga Rao and T. K. Bhagavathy were one of the most famous for their father roles in 1960's and 1970's. He has acted along with most of lead actors like M. G. Ramachandran, Sivaji Ganesan, Gemini Ganesan.His notable movie are Sampoorna Ramayanam, Sivagangai Seemai Panama Pasama, En Annan Savaale Samali, Rajapart Rangadurai. His last film was Aarilirunthu Arubathu Varai with Rajinikanth.

Death 
He died in 1982 at the age of 65.

Filmography

References 

1917 births
1982 deaths
Indian male actors